Caleb Olaniyan is a Nigerian Professor of Zoology, and former President of the Nigerian Academy of Science.

In 1989, he was elected President of the Nigerian Academy of Science to succeeded Professor Ifedayo Oladapo.

References

Living people
Nigerian zoologists
Fellows of the Nigerian Academy of Science
Year of birth missing (living people)